ESAIM: Control, Optimisation and Calculus of Variations is a scientific journal in the field of applied mathematics.

External links
 

Mathematics journals
EDP Sciences academic journals